Hjelmeland og Fister is a former municipality in Rogaland county, Norway. The  municipality existed from 1859 until its dissolution in 1884. It encompassed the area of today's Hjelmeland municipality plus the eastern islands in today's Stavanger municipality.  The administrative centre of the municipality was the village of Hjelmelandsvågen.  There were two churches in the municipality: Fister Church and Hjelmeland Church.

History
The municipality of Hjelmeland og Fister was established in 1859 when the old municipality of Hjelmeland was split into Årdal and Hjelmeland og Fister. Initially, Hjelmeland og Fister had 3,084 residents. On 6 March 1869, a small area of Årdal municipality (population: 40) was transferred to Hjelmeland og Fister. The municipality was split into two on 1 July 1884.

See also
List of former municipalities of Norway

References

Hjelmeland
Stavanger
Former municipalities of Norway
1859 establishments in Norway
1884 disestablishments in Norway